Paul Earl Ward (January 30, 1937 – December 19, 2018) was an American football defensive tackle in the National Football League for the Detroit Lions. He also was the University of Kentucky head track and field coach. He played college football at Whitworth College.

Early years
Ward attended Burbank High School where he was all-league in football and track.

He accepted a football scholarship from Whitworth College, following his brother Bob footsteps. He also competed in track, in the events of Shot put and Discus throw. He graduated with a degree in Arts in 1958. He earned a physical education master's degree at the University of Washington in 1963.

Professional career
Ward played on the United States Marine Corps football teams, before being signed as an undrafted free agent by the Detroit Lions after the 1961 NFL Draft on October 18. He became the first Whitworth College graduate to play in the NFL. He was waived on September 4, 1962. He was later re-signed during the season. He was released on September 3, 1963.

Personal life
His brother Bob, was the strength and conditioning coach for the Dallas Cowboys in the National Football League (NFL) and the Fullerton College head track and field coach.

He served in the United States Marine Corps from 1958 to 1961, attaining the rank of Captain. In 1966, he was mentioned in the book Paper Lion written by George Plimpton. He was part of the Portland State University football coaching staff from 1965 to 1969 and also coached the weight lifting team. In 1968, he was the Portland State University track head coach. In 1973, he received his Doctorate in Physical Education from Indiana University. He was the head track coach at the University of Kentucky from 1973 to 1974.

He was the Director of Education, Research & Development for the Health and Tennis Corporation of America from 1974 to 1989. He served as an Exercise and Sports Performance Consultant for the Dallas Cowboys in the NFL in 1977.

Ward co-authored the book Encyclopedia of Weight Training: Weight Training for General Conditioning, Sport and Body Building (1997). He also published scientific articles (biomechanics & exercise science) in magazines like Muscle & Fitness.

In addition, he began competing in Masters athletics, winning multiple Masters Olympic lifting championships. Furthermore, he trained and coached elite and US Olympic track & field athletes, among them Lorna Griffin and Bonnie Dasse. He served in the US Olympic Committee as elite athlete coordinator for throws from 1982 to 1984.

Ward died of natural causes on December 19, 2018.

References

External links
Paul Ward Obituary

1937 births
2018 deaths
Detroit Lions players
Indiana University alumni
Kentucky Wildcats track and field coaches
Sportspeople from Santa Fe, New Mexico
Players of American football from New Mexico
Track and field athletes from New Mexico
College track and field coaches in the United States
Portland State Vikings football coaches
Portland State Vikings track and field coaches
United States Marines
University of Washington alumni
Whitworth Pirates football players